Welcome Home is a 1989 American drama film directed by Franklin Schaffner. It was Schaffner's last film and was released posthumously. This film stars Kris Kristofferson as a Vietnam War veteran who returns to his family and tries to readjust to life after a nearly 20 year absence. The film also stars JoBeth Williams, Brian Keith, and Sam Waterston. The theme song for the film, "Welcome Home" was performed by Willie Nelson.

Plot
Jake Robbins went off to Vietnam, leaving his wife behind to mourn when he is reported missing and presumed dead. Seventeen years later, he unexpectedly returns. Having been a prisoner of war, Jake was rescued and ended up in Cambodia where he had a family. Jake's reappearance is a godsend for his father, Harry, but a mixed blessing for wife Sarah, who has moved on with her life. While old feelings stir in her, Jake confronts the military on how his disappearance was handled, and, more importantly, on how to track down his missing Southeast Asian wife and child.

Cast

Box office and critical reception
The film was not a box-office success. 
Movie historian Leonard Maltin's TV, Movie & Video Guide gave the picture 2 out of a possible 4 stars, citing it as "tolerably sincere at best, embalmed at worst."

Legacy
Unlike the similarly-named Welcome Home, Johnny Bristol, which features an Army conspiracy theory that turns out to be delusion, Welcome Home features a conspiracy of silence with regard to Vietnam War prisoners which is all too real.

References

External links
 
 
 
 AFI Catalog

1989 films
1989 drama films
American drama films
Columbia Pictures films
Films directed by Franklin J. Schaffner
Films scored by Henry Mancini
Vietnam War films
1980s English-language films
1980s American films